Hviezdoslav is a Slovak name, meaning star celebrator.
 Pavol Országh Hviezdoslav
 Hviezdoslavovo námestie ("Hviezdoslav Square")
 in Bratislava, see Hviezdoslavovo námestie (Bratislava)
 in Námestovo, see Hviezdoslavovo námestie (Námestovo)
 in Nové Zámky, see Hviezdoslavovo námestie (Nové Zámky)
 3980 Hviezdoslav (1983 XU), a main-belt asteroid discovered in 1983 by Mrkos

See also 
 Hviezdoslavova
 Hvězda (disambiguation) (Czech word)
 Hvězdonice
 Hvězdoňovice
 Hvězdlice
 Gwiazdy
 Gwiazdowo (disambiguation) (Polish toponym)
 Gwiazdowski (disambiguation)

Slovak-language surnames